Nohoch Cheʼen, also commonly known as Caves Branch, is an archaeological reserve in Belize, consisting of a network of limestone caves.

References

Caves of Belize
Maya sites in Belize
Parks in Belize
Protected areas established in 2010